Docklands Highway is an urban highway stretching 12 kilometres from Brooklyn in Melbourne's inner western suburbs to the Docklands precinct, adjacent to the city. This name covers many consecutive streets and is not widely known to most drivers, as the entire allocation is still best known as by the names of its constituent parts: Francis Street, Whitehall Street, Moreland Street, Napier Street, Footscray Road, Dudley Street and Wurundjeri Way. This article will deal with the entire length of the corridor for sake of completion, as well to avoid confusion between declarations.

Route
Francis Street starts at the intersection with Geelong Road and Millers Road in Brooklyn and heads east as a dual-lane, single-carriageway road, crossing the Newport–Sunshine railway line shortly after and widens to a four-lane, single-carriageway road, continuing east through Yarraville, before turning north along Whitehall Street through the eastern fringes of Footscray (southbound traffic uses Moreland Street for the last 500 metres), before it turns east and runs along Napier Street across the Maribyrnong River and continues east as Footscray Road as an eight-lane, dual-carriageway road through the industrial precinct of West Melbourne. It meets Docklands Drive and Harbour Esplanade on the northern borders of Docklands, turning east to run briefly along Dudley Street before turning south again to run along Wurundjeri Way, as a four-lane, dual-carriageway road, until it meets Flinders Street and turns west briefly to cross the Yarra River over the Charles Grimes Bridge as a six-lane, dual-carriageway road, until terminating at Montague Street shortly afterwards under the interchange with West Gate Freeway.

History
Footscray Road was signed as State Route 32 between Footscray and West Melbourne in 1965; State Route 35 was re-routed from Hyde Street to Whitehall Street in 1989, while State Route 50 formed a concurrency along Whitehall Street in the same year; State Route 30 was extended west from Flinders Street along North Wharf Road and across the Charles Grimes Bridge also in 1989; this alignment was subsumed into Wurundjeri Way in 1999. National Highway 31 was re-aligned to run along Wurundjeri Way when it opened in 1999; this was replaced by State Route 55 in 2005.

The passing of the Transport Act of 1983 (itself an evolution from the original Highways and Vehicles Act of 1924) provided for the declaration of State Highways, roads two-thirds financed by the State government through the Road Construction Authority (later VicRoads). The State Highway (Francis Street) and State Highway (Whitehall Street/Moreland Street) were declared State Highways in June 1990, along Francis Street from Geelong Road in Brooklyn to Whitehall Street in eastern Yarraville, and then along Whitehall and Moreland Streets to Footscray Road in eastern Footscray. These two highways were fused into one a year later, re-declared the Docklands Highway, and extended east along Napier Street across the Maribyrnong River in June 1991. It was extended again along Footscray Road, across the Yarra River over the Charles Grimes Bridge to end at the interchange of Montague Street with the West Gate Freeway in September 1994, later re-aligned along Dudley Street and Wurundjeri Way when the latter opened in 1999; all roads were known (and signposted) as their constituent parts.

The passing of the Road Management Act 2004 granted the responsibility of overall management and development of Victoria's major arterial roads to VicRoads: in 2004, VicRoads re-declared the road as Docklands Highway (Arterial #6120), from Geelong Road in Brooklyn to Montague Street in Southbank, and as before, all roads are still presently known (and signposted) as their constituent parts.

Major intersections

|}

See also

 List of Melbourne highways

References

Highways and freeways in Melbourne
Transport in the City of Hobsons Bay
Transport in the City of Melbourne (LGA)
Transport in the City of Maribyrnong